Cristián Warnken (born January 28, 1961) is a Chilean literature professor, columnist, interviewer, radio personality, podcaster, and television presenter. In 2020 he interviewed President Sebastián Piñera. Warnken has been dean of the Faculty of Education and Humanities of Universidad del Desarrollo. He was elected as permanent member of the Academia Chilena de Ciencias Sociales, Políticas y Morales in 2022.

References

1961 births
Living people
Spanish literature academics
Chilean television presenters
Chilean radio journalists
Chilean columnists
21st-century Chilean poets
Chilean male poets
Members of Amarillos por Chile